Nease is a surname. Notable people with the surname include:

Allen Nease (died 1983), American conservationist
Floyd Nease (disambiguation), multiple people
Orval J. Nease (1891–1950), American Nazarene minister
Stephen W. Nease (1925–2006), American educator and college president
Steve Nease, Canadian cartoonist